Bogdan Ionuț Miron (born 2 January 1982) is a former Romanian footballer who played as a goalkeeper. He made his Liga I debut in a 0–0 draw away to Politehnica Timișoara in September 2009, a performance for which he was named man of the match.

Honours

CSMS Iași
Liga II: 2013–14

Gauss Bacău
Liga IV – Bacău County: 2017–18

Hușana Huși
Liga IV – Vaslui County: 2018–19

Aerostar Bacău
Liga III: 2019–20

References

External links
 
 

1982 births
Living people
Sportspeople from Bacău
Romanian footballers
Association football goalkeepers
Liga I players
Liga II players
FC Petrolul Ploiești players
CSM Jiul Petroșani players
FC Astra Giurgiu players
CSU Voința Sibiu players
CSM Ceahlăul Piatra Neamț players
FC Politehnica Iași (2010) players
FCM Dunărea Galați players
CS Aerostar Bacău players